Joseph Antoine Tancrède Auguste (March 16, 1856 – May 2, 1913) as the 20th President of Haiti from August 8, 1912 until his death in office on May 2, 1913. He assumed the presidency the day that Cincinnatus Leconte died in office from a massive explosion that destroyed the presidential palace. Auguste served in this capacity for less than one year, as he became ill and died while traveling in the north of the country in early May 1913. It is widely believed by some sources that he was the victim of poisoning. He was the grandfather of Haitian writer Jacques Roumain.

Life 
Son of André P. Auguste and Ernestine Rotgers, he is the owner of a trading house in Port-au-Prince, then becomes Minister of the Interior and Police under the presidencies of Florvil Hyppolite and Tiresias Simon Sam (1895 1897-1902) 1. He is part of the Council of Secretaries of State (with Tiresias Simon Sam and Solon Menos) who ensured the transition to power from March 24, 1896 to March 31, 1896, between the death of Florvil Hyppolite and the election of Tiresias Simon Sam. a trip to the North of the country, Tancredus Augustus was sick and died May 2, 1913. The Council of Secretaries of State composed of Seymour Pradel, F. Baufosse Laroche, Jacques Nicolas Leger, Tertullien Guilbaud, Edmond Lespinasse and Guatimosin Boco took power from May 3 to 12, 1913. Married on March 16, 1878 to Ancelinette Rose Durand, they have 7 children (3 sons and 4 daughters) successively named Louis, Lucie, Joseph, Louisa, Émilie, Fernande and René1. He is the grandfather of Jacques Roumain, a poet writer and Communist politician who had a considerable influence on Haitian culture.

Presidents of Haiti
1856 births
1913 deaths
People from Cap-Haïtien
Government ministers of Haiti